Chlorogloea is a genus of cyanobacteria belonging to the family Entophysalidaceae.

The genus has cosmopolitan distribution.

Species:

Chlorogloea conferta
Chlorogloea microcystoides 
Chlorogloea purpurea 
Chlorogloea tuberculosa

References

Chroococcales
Cyanobacteria genera